The Squash at the 2014 Commonwealth Games held at the Scotstoun Sports Campus, Glasgow. Singles play took place from 24 July to 28 July.

Top seed Nicol David defeated the 2nd seed Laura Massaro 12–10, 11–2, 11–4 in 46 minutes to win the gold medal.

Medalists

Seeds

Draws & Results

Main draw
The draw.

Finals

Top Half

Section 1

Section 2

Bottom Half

Section 1

Section 2

Plate

Section 1

Section 2

Section 3

Section 4

Consolation

References

Squash at the 2014 Commonwealth Games
Common